Bernard Boxill is an American philosopher and distinguished professor of philosophy emeritus at the University of North Carolina at Chapel Hill. He is known for his works on ethics and political philosophy.

References

21st-century American philosophers
Political philosophers
Philosophy academics
Living people
University of North Carolina at Chapel Hill faculty
Year of birth missing (living people)
Place of birth missing (living people)